Ethmia distigmatella is a moth in the family Depressariidae. It is found on Crete and in the Taurus Mountains in Turkey, as well as in Afghanistan, Uzbekistan and Turkmenistan.

References

Moths described in 1874
distigmatella
Moths of Europe
Insects of Turkey